Trichophaga tapetzella, the tapestry moth or carpet moth, is a moth of the family Tineidae. It is found worldwide.

The wingspan is 14–18 mm. The head is white, the forewings
ochreous-white, thinly strigulated with grey; basal 2/5 dark purplish-fuscous; a roundish grey posterior discal spot; some small black spots about apex. Hindwings light brassy-grey. The moth flies from June to September depending on the location.

The larvae feed on animal skin, bird nests, pellets, fur, clothing and floor and furniture covering made of animal skin.

Tapestry moths complete their cycles within a year and are more like webbing clothes moths in that they spin webbing in areas where they like to reside. Their speed of development depends entirely upon local temperature, humidity and food supplies.

References

External links
Tapestry moth at UKmoths
Caterpillars of Australia
Lepiforum.de

Tineinae
Moths described in 1758
Taxa named by Carl Linnaeus